Malik Rosier Jr. (born October 18, 1995) (pronounced Rô-seer) is a former American football quarterback for the Miami Hurricanes.

College career
Malik was a three-star dual-threat quarterback from Faith Academy in Mobile, Alabama. He decided to attend Miami. He redshirted in 2014, and was the backup of quarterback Brad Kaaya in 2015 and 2016. In 2017, Rosier was named the starter. He led the Canes to a 10–0 start and a #2 College Football Playoff ranking, with wins over Florida State, #13 Virginia Tech, and #3 Notre Dame. The win against rival FSU in Tallahassee broke a 7-game losing streak in the series, the first time the Canes had beaten the Seminoles since 2009. He returned as a starter in 2018.

Rosier also played baseball as a freshman at Miami in 2015.

College statistics

Professional career
Rosier went undrafted during the 2019 NFL Draft. On May 6, 2019, the Miami Dolphins invited Rosier to a minicamp but wasn't signed by the team.

References

1995 births
Living people
Sportspeople from Mobile, Alabama
Players of American football from Alabama
American football quarterbacks
Miami Hurricanes football players
Miami Hurricanes baseball players